The Bird Who Continues to Eat the Rabbit's Flower is a release by the Elephant 6 band Of Montreal. It is an extended version of their EP The Bird Who Ate the Rabbit's Flower; the first five tracks are the ones from that first effort.

Track listing
All songs by Kevin Barnes except where noted.

"You Are an Airplane" – 4:24
"The Inner Light" – 3:23
"When a Man Is in Love with a Man" – 2:21
"If I Faltered Slightly Twice" – 2:27
"Disguises" (Pete Townshend) – 4:08
"On the Drive Home" – 2:51
"The Secret Ocean" (Andrew Rieger) - 3:03
"I Felt Like Smashing My Face Through a Clear Glass Window" (Yoko Ono) - 4:01
"Christmas Is Only Good if You're Not an Animal" (Japanese bonus track) - 2:04
"My Favorite Christmas (In a Hundred Words or Less)" (Japanese bonus track) 2:53

Bird Who Continues to Eat the Rabbit's Flower, The
Bird Who Continues to Eat the Rabbit's Flower, The
Kindercore Records EPs